This list of the prehistoric life of North Carolina contains the various prehistoric life-forms whose fossilized remains have been reported from within the US state of North Carolina.

Precambrian-Paleozoic
The Paleobiology Database records no known occurrences of Precambrian or Paleozoic fossils in North Carolina.

Mesozoic

Selected Mesozoic taxa of North Carolina

 Acesta
 Acirsa
 †Adocus
  †Aetosaurus
 †Ampullina – tentative report
 †Anomia
 †Anomoeodus
 †Apatopus
 †Arca
 Architectonica
  †Arganodus
 Astarte – tentative report
 †Asteracanthus
 †Atreipus
 †Baena – tentative report
 †Baikuris – report made of unidentified related form or using admittedly obsolete nomenclature
 Barbatia
  †Belemnitella
 †Belemnitella americana
 †Borealosuchus
 †Borealosuchus formidabilis
 †Boreogomphodon
 †Boreogomphodon jeffersoni
 Botula
 †Botula carolinensis
 †Brachymeris
 †Brachyphyllum
 Caestocorbula
 †Caestocorbula crassiplica
 Candona
 Carcharias – tentative report
  †Carnufex – type locality for genus
 †Carnufex carolinensis – type locality for species
 Cerithiella
 †Cerithiella nodoliratum
 †Cerithiella semirugatum
  †Cimolomys
 Cladophlebis
 Cliona
 †Coahomasuchus
 †Colognathus
 Corbula
 †Crenella
 †Crenella serica
  †Cretolamna
  †Crosbysaurus
 Cucullaea
 †Cucullaea capax
 Cylichna
 †Cylindracanthus
 †Cymella
 Cyzicus
  †Deinosuchus
 †Deinosuchus rugosus
 Dictyocephalus – type locality for genus
 †Diplurus
 †Dreissena – tentative report
 †Dromicosuchus – type locality for genus
 †Dromicosuchus grallator – type locality for species
 †Egertonia
  †Enchodus
 †Enchodus petrosus – or unidentified comparable form
 †Equisetum
 †Estheria
  †Euspira
  †Eutrephoceras
 †Exogyra
 †Exogyra cancellata
 †Exogyra costata
 Gegania
 Glycymeris
 †Gorgetosuchus – type locality for genus
 †Gorgosaurus
 †Hadrosaurus
 †Hadrosaurus minor – tentative report
  †Halisaurus
 †Hamulus
 †Hybodus
 †Hybodus montanensis
 †Hypophylloceras
 †Hypsibema – type locality for genus
 †Hypsibema crassicauda – type locality for species
  †Inoceramus
 †Ischyodus
 †Ischyodus bifurcatus – or unidentified comparable form
 †Ischyrhiza
 †Ischyrhiza mira
 Isognomon
 Isurus
  †Leidyosuchus – tentative report
 †Lepidodendron
 Lima
 Limatula
 †Linearis
 †Lingula
 †Linthia
 Lopha
 †Lopha falcata
 †Lucasuchus
 †Lucasuchus hunti
 †Lucina
  †Lytoceras
 Martesia – tentative report
 †Mecistotrachelos
 †Mecistotrachelos apeoros
 Melanatria – tentative report
 †Morea
  †Mosasaurus
 †Neocalamites
 Nerita
 Nucula
 Odontaspis
 †Ornithomimus – tentative report
 Ostrea
 †Pagiophyllum
 †Pannaulika
 Panopea
 †Paralbula
 †Paranomia
 †Pekinosaurus – type locality for genus
 †Pekinosaurus olseni – type locality for species
 Pholadidea – tentative report
 Pholadomya
 Phyllodus
 †Pinna
  †Placenticeras – tentative report
  †Placerias
 †Placerias hesternus
 †Platecarpus
 †Plinthogomphodon – type locality for genus
 †Plinthogomphodon herpetairus – type locality for species
 Polinices
  †Postosuchus
 †Postosuchus alisonae – type locality for species
 †Prognathodon
 †Protocardia
 †Pteria – tentative report
 †Pterophyllum
 †Pterotrigonia
 †Pterotrigonia cerulea
 †Pterotrigonia eufalensis
 †Pterotrigonia eufaulensis
 Pycnodonte
 †Pycnodonte belli
 †Pycnodonte vesicularis
  †Revueltosaurus
 †Revueltosaurus olseni
 †Rhombodus
  †Rutiodon – type locality for genus
 †Rutiodon carolinensis – type locality for species
  †Saurodon
 †Scapanorhynchus
 †Scapanorhynchus texanus
 †Scoyenia – tentative report
 †Semionotus
 Serpula
 †Sphenodiscus
  Squalicorax
 †Squalicorax kaupi
 †Squalicorax pristodontus
 Squatina
 †Stegomus
 †Stephanodus
 †Tanytrachelos – type locality for genus
 †Tanytrachelos ahynis – type locality for species
 Trachycardium
 Trichotropis
 †Trigonia – tentative report
 Trionyx
 Turritella
 †Turritella trilira
  †Tylosaurus
 †Uatchitodon
 †Uatchitodon schneideri – type locality for species
 †Williamsonia
 †Xiphactinus
 †Xiphactinus audax
  †Zamites
 †Zamites powelli

Cenozoic

Selected Cenozoic taxa of North Carolina

 Abies
 †Abies
 †Abra
 Acanthocybium
  †Acanthocybium solandri
 †Acantholambrus
 †Acantholambrus baumi
 †Acarinina
 Acipenser
 Acrosterigma
 Acteocina
 †Actinocyclus
 Aequipecten
 Aesopus
 †Aesopus stearnsii
  Aetobatus
 Agaronia
 Agassizia
 †Agassizia scrobiculata
 Agatrix
 †Albertocetus – type locality for genus
 Alca
 †Alca torda – or unidentified related form
 Alnus
 Alopias
  †Alopias superciliosus
 †Alopias vulpinus
 Alosa
 †Alosa sapidissima – or unidentified comparable form
  Aluterus
 †Ambrosia
 Americardia
 †Americardia media
 Ammodytes
 Amusium
 †Anabernicula
 Anachis
 Anadara
 †Anadara brasiliana
 †Anadara floridana
 †Anadara ovalis
 †Anadara transversa
 Anas
 †Anas acuta
 †Anas americana
  †Anas clypeata
 †Anas discors
 †Anas platyrhynchos
 Angulus
 Anisotremus
 Anodontia
 †Anodontia alba
 Anomia
 †Anomia simplex
 †Anomotodon
 Anser
  Apalone – or unidentified comparable form
 †Araeodelphis
 Arbacia
 Arca
 Architectonica
 †Archosargus
  †Archosargus probatocephalus – or unidentified comparable form
 Arcinella
 †Arcinella cornuta
 Ardea
 †Ardea cinerea – or unidentified related form
 Argopecten
 †Argopecten gibbus
 †Argopecten irradians
 Argyrotheca
 †Artemisia
 Artena
 Astarte
 Astyris
 †Astyris lunata
 Athleta
  †Atocetus – or unidentified related form
 Atrina
 †Aturia
 †Auroracetus – type locality for genus
 Auxis
 Axelella
 Aythya
 †Aythya affinis – or unidentified related form
 Bagre
 Balaena
 Balaenoptera
 †Balaenoptera acutorostrata
  †Balaenula
 Balanophyllia
 Balanus
 Balearica – tentative report
 Barbatia
 Barnea
 †Basilotritus
 †Belosaepia
 Betula
 Bittium
  †Bohaskaia
 †Bohaskaia monodontoides
 Boonea
 †Boonea impressa
 †Boonea seminuda
 †Bootherium
  †Bootherium bombifrons
 Boreotrophon – report made of unidentified related form or using admittedly obsolete nomenclature
  †Borophagus
 †Borophagus dudleyi – or unidentified comparable form
 †Borophagus orc – or unidentified comparable form
 Bostrycapulus
 †Bostrycapulus aculeatus
 Botrychium
 †Botrychium dissectum – or unidentified comparable form
 †Botryococcus
 Brachidontes
 Branta
 †Branta bernicla – or unidentified related form
 †Brasenia
 Brotula
 Buccella
 Bucephala
 †Bucephala albeola – or unidentified related form
 †Bucephala clangula – or unidentified related form
 Bulweria – tentative report
 †Burnhamia
 Busycon
 †Busycon carica
  †Busycon contrarium
 †Busycon perversum
 Busycotypus
 †Busycotypus canaliculatus
 Buteo
  †Buteo jamaicensis
 Cadulus
 Caecum
 †Caecum imbricatum
 †Caecum pulchellum
 †Caecum regulare
  †Calappilia
 Calidris
 †Calidris melanotos – or unidentified related form
 Callinectes
 †Callinectes sapidus
 Calliostoma
 Callista
 †Callophoca
 Calonectris
 †Calonectris borealis – or unidentified related form
 †Calonectris diomedea – or unidentified related form
 Calotrophon
 †Calotrophon ostrearum
 Calyptraea
 †Calyptraea centralis
  Cancellaria
 Capella
 †Capella media – or unidentified related form
 Carcharhinus
 †Carcharhinus brachyurus
  †Carcharhinus falciformis
 †Carcharhinus leucas
 †Carcharhinus macloti
 †Carcharhinus obscurus
 †Carcharhinus perezi
 †Carcharhinus plumbeus
 Carcharias
 †Carcharias taurus
 Carcharodon
 †Carcharodon carcharias
  †Carcharodon hastalis
 Carditamera
 Caretta
 Carya
 Cassidulina
 †Cassigerinella
 †Cassigerinella chipolensis
 Cassis
 Castanea
 Catharacta
 †Caulolatilus
 †Caulolatilus cyanops – or unidentified comparable form
 †Cavilucina
 Centropristis
 †Centropristis striata – or unidentified comparable form
 Cerastoderma
  Ceratoscopelus
 Cerithiopsis
 †Cerithiopsis vinca
 Cerithium
 †Cerithium eburneum
 Cerodrillia – report made of unidentified related form or using admittedly obsolete nomenclature
 †Cerodrillia simpsoni
 †Cerorhinca
 Cetorhinus
  †Cetotherium
 Chaetopleura
 Chama
 †Chama congregata
 †Chama macerophylla
 Chamelea
 Chelonia – tentative report
  Chelonibia
 Chemnitzia
 †Chesapecten
 †Chesapecten jeffersonius
 Chilomycterus
  †Chilomycterus schoepfi
 †Chilomycterus schoepfii
 Chione
 †Chione cancellata
 Chlamys
 Chrysemys
 Cibicides
 Ciconia
 Cidaris
 Circulus – report made of unidentified related form or using admittedly obsolete nomenclature
  Citharichthys
 Cladocora
 †Cladogramma
 Clathrodrillia – report made of unidentified related form or using admittedly obsolete nomenclature
 Clathrus
 Clavatula
 †Clavicula
  Clavilithes – or unidentified comparable form
 Clavus – report made of unidentified related form or using admittedly obsolete nomenclature
 †Claytonia – type locality for genus
 Cliona – tentative report
 Closia
 Cochliolepis
  Coelopleurus
 Colubraria
 †Colymboides – tentative report
 Compsodrillia
 Concavus
 Conger
 †Conger oceanicus – or unidentified comparable form
 Conus
 Corbicula
 Corbula
 Corvus
  †Corvus ossifragus – or unidentified related form
 †Corylus
 †Coscinodiscus
 †Cosmodiscus
 Cotonopsis
  †Cotonopsis lafresnayi
 Crania
 †Craspedodiscus
 †Crassinella lunulata
 Crassispira
  Crassostrea
 †Crassostrea virginica
 †Crenatocetus – type locality for genus
 Crenella
 Crepidula
 †Crepidula convexa
 †Crepidula fornicata
 †Crepidula plana
 Crucibulum
 Cumingia
  †Cuvieronius
 Cyclocardia
 Cygnus
 †Cygnus columbianus – or unidentified related form
 Cylichna
 †Cylindracanthus
 Cymatium
 †Cymatosira
 Cymatosyrinx
 Cynoscion
 †Cynoscion nebulosus – or unidentified comparable form
  †Cynthiacetus
 Cypraea
 Dasyatis
  †Dasyatis americana – or unidentified comparable form
 †Dasyatis centroura
 †Dasyatis say
 †Deinosuchus
 †Deinosuchus rugosus
  Delphinapterus
 Delphinus
  Dentalium
 †Denticula
 Dentimargo
 Dermomurex
 †Dictyocha
 †Didianema
 Dinocardium
 †Dinocardium robustum
 Diodora
 †Diplodonta punctata
 †Distephanus
 Distorsio
 Donax
 †Donax fossor
  †Donax variabilis
 Dosinia
 †Dosinia discus
 Echinocardium
 Echinorhinus
 †Ecphora
 †Ectopistes
  †Ectopistes migratorius – or unidentified related form
 Electra
 Elphidium
 Emarginula
 Ensis
 †Ensis directus
 Epinephelus
 Epitonium
 †Epitonium humphreysii
 Equetus
 Ervilia
 Erycina
 Eudocimus
 Eulima
 Eupleura
 †Eupleura caudata
  Euspira
 †Euspira heros
 †Eutrephoceras
 Euvola
 †Euvola raveneli
 Fabella
 Fasciolaria
 †Fasciolaria tulipa
 Fenimorea
 †Ficopsis
 Ficus
 †Ficus communis
 Flabellum
 Fratercula
  †Fratercula arctica – or unidentified related form
 †Fratercula cirrhata – or unidentified related form
 †Fraxinus
 Fulgurofusus
 Fusinus
 Gadus
  †Gadus morhua – or unidentified comparable form
 Galeocerdo
 †Galeocerdo contortus
  †Galeocerdo cuvier – or unidentified comparable form
 Galeodea
 Galeorhinus
  †Galeorhinus galeus
 Gari
 Gastrochaena
 Gavia
 Gemma
 †Gemma gemma
 Geochelone
 Geodia
 †Gigantostrea
 Ginglymostoma
  Globicephala
 Globigerina
 †Globigerina bulloides
 Globigerinoides
 †Globorotalia menardii
 Glossus
 Glycymeris
 †Glycymeris americana
 Glyphostoma
 Glyphoturris
 †Glyphoturris eritima
 Glyptoactis
  †Gomphotherium
 Granulina
 Grus
 †Grus americana – or unidentified related form
 †Grus antigone – or unidentified related form
 †Gryphoca
 †Hadrosaurus
 Haematopus
 †Haematopus ostralegus – or unidentified related form
 †Haematopus palliatus – or unidentified related form
 Haustator – tentative report
 Heilprinia
 †Heliornis
 †Heliornis fulica – or unidentified related form
  †Hemiauchenia – or unidentified comparable form
 Hemipristis
  †Hemipristis serra
 †Hemirhabdorhynchus
 †Herpetocetus
 Heterodontus
 Hexanchus
 Hiatella
 †Hiatella arctica
 Histrionicus
 †Histrionicus histrionicus – or unidentified related form
 †Homiphoca
 Hyalina
 †Hyalodiscus
 Hydroides – tentative report
 †Hypogaleus
 Ilyanassa
 †Ilyanassa obsoleta
 †Ilyanassa trivittata
 Ischadium
 †Ischadium recurvum
  Isistius
 Isoetes
 Isognomon
 Istiophorus
  †Istiophorus platypterus
 Isurus
 †Isurus oxyrinchus
 Ithycythara
 †Ithycythara psila
 Juniperus
 †Juniperus virginiana – or unidentified comparable form
 †Kellum
  †Kentriodon
 Kogia – or unidentified comparable form
 †Kogia breviceps
 †Kogiopsis – or unidentified comparable form
 †Kogiopsis floridana
 Kuphus
 Kurtziella
 †Kurtziella cerina
 †Kyptoceras
 Laevicardium
 †Laevicardium mortoni
 Lagena
  Lagenorhynchus
 †Lagodon
 †Lagodon rhomboides – or unidentified comparable form
 Lamna
 Larus
 †Larus argentatus – or unidentified related form
  †Larus atricilla – or unidentified related form
 †Larus delawarensis – or unidentified related form
 †Larus minutus – or unidentified related form
 Leiostomus
  Lepidochelys
 Limaria
 Linga
 †Linthia
 Liquidambar
 Littoraria
 †Littoraria irrorata
 Littorina
 †Lonicera
 Lophius
  †Lophius americanus – or unidentified comparable form
 †Lophocetus – or unidentified related form
 Lopholatilus
 †Lopholatilus chamaeleonticeps
 Lucina
 †Lucina pensylvanica
 Lyria
 Macoma
 Macrocallista
 †Macrocallista nimbosa
 †Macromphalina
 †Macromphalina pierrot
 Makaira
 †Makaira indica
 †Makaira nigricans
 †Mammut
  †Mammut americanum
 Manta
 Maretia
 Marginella
  Megachasma
 Megalops
 †Megalops atlanticus – or unidentified comparable form
  Megaptera
 †Meherrinia – type locality for genus
 †Meherrinia isoni – type locality for species
 Meiocardia
 Melanella
 †Melanella conoidea
 Melanitta
 †Melanitta nigra – or unidentified related form
 †Melanitta perspicillata – or unidentified related form
 Melanogrammus
 †Melanogrammus aeglefinus – or unidentified comparable form
 Meleagris
 Menippe – tentative report
 Mercenaria
 †Mercenaria mercenaria
 Meretrix
 Mergus
  †Mergus serrator – or unidentified related form
 Merluccius
 †Merluccius albidus
 †Merluccius bilinearis – or unidentified comparable form
 Mesoplodon
 Metulella
 Microgadus
 †Microgadus tomcod – or unidentified comparable form
 Micropogonias
 Mitra
 Mitrella
  Mobula
 Modiolus
 †Modiolus modiolus
 Mola
  Monodon – or unidentified comparable form
 Morus
 Muellerina
 Mulinia
 †Mulinia lateralis
 Musculus
 †Musculus lateralis
 Mustelus
 †Mya
  †Mya arenaria
 Mycteroperca
 Myliobatis
 Myriophyllum
 Mytilus
  †Nannippus
 †Nanosiren – tentative report
 Nassarius
 †Nassarius acutus
 †Nassarius antillarum
 †Nassarius vibex
 Naticarius
 †Navicula
 Negaprion
 †Negaprion brevirostris
 †Neohipparion
  Neophrontops – tentative report
 Neverita
 Niso
 †Nitzschia
 Niveria
 †Niveria suffusa
 Notorynchus
 Nucula
 †Nucula proxima
 †Nuculana acuta
 Numenius
 †Numenius borealis – or unidentified related form
 †Nuphar
 Nymphaea
 †Nyssa
 Odontaspis
  †Odontaspis ferox
 Odostomia
 †Odostomia acutidens
 Oliva
  †Oliva sayana
 Olivella
 †Olivella minuta
 †Olivella mutica
 Onoba
 †Ontocetus – type locality for genus
 †Ontocetus emmonsi – type locality for species
 Oocorys
 Ophidion
  †Opsanus
 †Opsanus tau
 Ortalis – tentative report
  †Orycterocetus
 †Osmunda
 †Osmunda regalis
 Ostrea
 †Ostrea compressirostra
 Ostrya
 †Otodus
  †Otodus megalodon
 Pachyptila
 Pagrus
 Pandion
 Pandora
 Panopea
 Paragaleus
 †Paralia
 Paralichthys
  †Parotodus
 †Parotodus benedenii
 Parvanachis
 †Parvanachis obesa
 Pecten
 †Pediastrum
 †Pediomeryx
  †Pelagornis
 Pelecanus
 †Pelecanus schreiberi – type locality for species
 Perotrochus
 Petaloconchus
 Petricola
 †Petricola pholadiformis
 Phalacrocorax
 Phalium
 †Phocageneus – or unidentified related form
 †Phocanella
 †Phoebastria
 †Phoebastria albatrus – or unidentified related form
 †Phoebastria immutabilis – or unidentified related form
 †Phoebastria nigripes – or unidentified related form
  Phoenicopterus
 Pholadomya
 Phyllonotus
 †Phyllonotus pomum
 Physeter – or unidentified comparable form
  †Physeter macrocephalus
 †Physeterula – or unidentified comparable form
 Picea
 †Pinguinus
 †Pinguinus alfrednewtoni – type locality for species
 Pinna – tentative report
 Pinus
 †Pinus palustris – or unidentified comparable form
 Pisania
 Pitar
 †Pitar morrhuanus
 Placopecten
 †Placopecten magellanicus – or unidentified related form
 †Platyphoca
  †Plesiocetus – or unidentified comparable form
 Pleurofusia
 Pleuromeris
 †Pleuromeris tridentata
 Pleurotomaria
 Plicatula
 †Plicatula gibbosa
 Pluvialis
 †Pluvialis squatarola – or unidentified related form
 Podiceps
  †Podiceps auritus
 Pogonias
 †Pogonias cromis – or unidentified comparable form
 Polinices
 Polydora
 Polygireulima
 Polygonum
 Polymesoda
 †Polymesoda caroliniana
 Pomatomus
  †Pontederia
 Pontoporia – or unidentified comparable form
 Populus
 †Potamogeton
 Prionotus
 †Prionotus evolans – or unidentified comparable form
 Pristiophorus
  Pristis
 Procellaria
 †Procellaria aequinoctialis – or unidentified comparable form
 †Procellaria parkinsoni – or unidentified comparable form
 †Procolpochelys
 †Protosiren
 Prunum
 †Prunum bellum
 †Prunum roscidum
 Psammechinus
  †Psephophorus
  †Pseudhipparion
 Pseudochama
 Pseudorca
 Pseudotorinia
 Pteria
 Pterodroma
 †Pterodroma lessonii
 †Pterodromoides
 †Pterodromoides minoricensis
 Pteromeris
 †Pteromeris perplana
 Pteromylaeus
  Pterothrissus
 †Ptychosalpinx
 Puffinus
 †Puffinus gravis – or unidentified related form
 †Puffinus lherminieri
 †Puffinus pacificoides – or unidentified related form
 †Puffinus puffinus – or unidentified comparable form
  †Puffinus tenuirostris – or unidentified related form
 Pugnus
 Puncturella
 Purpura
 Purpurellus
 Pusula
 †Pusula pediculus
 Pycnodonte
 Pyramidella
 †Quadrans
  Quercus
 Raja
 Rangia
 Ranina – type locality for genus
 Ranunculus
 Retilaskeya
 †Retilaskeya bicolor
 Rhincodon
 Rhinobatos
 Rhinoptera
 Rhizoprionodon – tentative report
 Rhynchobatus
  †Rhynchotherium
 Ringicula
 Rissoina
 †Robinia – type locality for genus
 Rosalina
 Sagittaria
 †Sanguisorba
 †Sanguisorba canadensis
 †Sarda
 †Sarda sarda – or unidentified related form
  †Scaldicetus – or unidentified comparable form
 Scaphella
 Schizaster
 Sciaenops
 †Sciaenops ocellatus
 †Scoliodon
 Sconsia
 †Scutella
 Scyliorhinus
 Seila
 †Seila adamsii
 Semele
 Semicassis
  Seriola
 Serpulorbis
 †Sheldonia – type locality for genus
 Siliqua
 Sinum
 †Sinum perspectivum
 Siphonalia
 Siphonochelus
 Solariella
 Solen
 Solenosteira
 †Solenosteira cancellaria
 Somateria
  †Somateria mollissima – or unidentified related form
 Sphagnum
 †Sphoeroides
 Sphyraena
 †Sphyraena barracuda – or unidentified comparable form
 Sphyrna
  †Sphyrna lewini
 †Sphyrna media – or unidentified comparable form
 †Sphyrna zygaena
 Spisula
 Spondylus
  †Squalodon
 †Squalodon calvertensis
 Squalus
 Squatina
 Stellatoma – report made of unidentified related form or using admittedly obsolete nomenclature
 †Stellatoma stellata
 †Stelletta
 Stenella
 †Stenotomus chrysops – or unidentified comparable form
 Stercorarius
  †Stercorarius longicaudus – or unidentified related form
 †Stercorarius parasiticus – or unidentified related form
 †Stercorarius pomarinus – or unidentified related form
 Sterna
  †Sterna maxima – or unidentified related form
 †Sterna nilotica – or unidentified related form
 Stewartia
 †Striatolamia
 Strioterebrum
 Strombiformis
 Strombina
 Strombus
 †Syllomus
  Symphurus
 Syntomodrillia
 †Syntomodrillia lissotropis
 Tagelus
  Tapirus
 †Tapirus veroensis
 Tautoga
 †Tautoga onitis – or unidentified comparable form
 Taxodium
 †Taxodium distichum
 Tectonatica
 †Tectonatica pusilla
 Teinostoma
 Tellina
  Tenagodus
 Terebra
 †Terebra protexta
 Terebratula
 †Tetraedron
 †Tetrapturus
 †Tetrapturus albidus
 Thais
  †Thalassinoides
 †Thalassiosira
 †Thalictrum
  †Thecachampsa
 †Thecachampsa antiqua
 Thracia
 Thunnus
 †Thunnus thynnus
 Timoclea
 Trachycardium
  †Trachycardium isocardia
 †Trachycardium muricatum
 †Triaenodon
  †Triaenodon obesus
 Trigonostoma
 †Trinacria
 Tringa
 †Tringa ochropus – or unidentified related form
 Trionyx
 Triphora
 Trochita
 Tucetona
 Turbo
 †Turbo castanea
 Turbonilla
 †Turbonilla abrupta
 †Turbonilla interrupta
 †Turbonilla nivea
 Turritella
  Tursiops
 Typha
 Typhis
 Urophycis
 †Urophycis tenuis
 Urosalpinx
  †Urosalpinx cinerea
 †Urosalpinx perrugata
 Vasum
 Venericardia
 Vermicularia
 †Vermicularia knorrii – or unidentified comparable form
 †Vermicularia spirata
 Verticordia
 Vexillum
 †Vexillum wandoense
  †Viburnum
 Viviparus – tentative report
 Volutifusus
 Volvarina
 †Volvarina avena
 Xenophora
  †Xiphiacetus
 Xiphias
 †Xiphias gladius
 †Xiphiorhynchus
 Yoldia
 †Yoldia limatula
 Ziphius
  †Ziphius cavirostris – or unidentified comparable form

References
 

North Carolina